Michael Ebeid  is an Australian business executive. He was CEO and managing director of the Special Broadcasting Service (SBS) between June 2011 and October 2018. 
Ebeid has nearly three decades of experience in media, technology and telecommunications, having held senior roles at IBM, Optus Communications, Two Way Limited, Australian Broadcasting Corporation (ABC) and Special Broadcasting Service (SBS).

Career
Ebeid worked with IBM for nine years in various roles across finance, sales and marketing, and worked in Tokyo and other Asian countries.

In 1995, he moved to Optus Communications, where he was Director of Commercial Operations  for the Consumer Division, with revenues of $1.8b and a staff of over 3000 supplying a range of services telephony, internet and pay television interests. He was on the Board of the subscription television industry body, ASTRA, from 2001 to 2005.

In 2005, Ebeid joined Two Way Limited, an interactive TV, mobile and online entertainment media business as COO and then as CEO. He took the company into Asia (Hong Kong, Malaysia, Singapore, India and NZ) establishing new business opportunities for the company.

Ebeid became the executive director of corporate strategy and marketing at the Australian Broadcasting Corporation (ABC) holding position until 2011 when he became CEO of SBS in 2011.

SBS 
Ebeid was appointed CEO and managing director of the Special Broadcasting Service (SBS) in June 2011 and he resigned on 1 October 2018.

Telstra 
As part of a new structure, Australian telecommunications company Telstra appointed Ebeid as Head of its Enterprise Division, on 8 October 2018. This appointment is part of the Telstra Group Executive team. Ebeid was Telstra Group Executive – Enterprise from 2018 to 2020.

Honours and recognition
Ebeid was made a Member of the Order of Australia (AM) in the 2017 Queen's Birthday Honours for "significant service to the broadcast media and multicultural affairs as an executive, innovator and business leader".

Ebeid was named CEO Magazine's 'CEO of the year' at the 2017 Executive Of The Year Awards, while CEO and managing director at SBS. Ebeid was a judge for the same award in 2018, as part of an eleven person panel.

Personal life
Ebeid was born in Cairo, Egypt, and moved to Sydney, Australia, with his family when he was three.

Ebeid, who came out as gay in the 1990s, has been described as, "without doubt one of Australia's most powerful media figures".
Ebeid was married in November 2018

References 

Year of birth missing (living people)
Living people
Businesspeople from Cairo
Egyptian emigrants to Australia
Australian chief executives
Australian LGBT businesspeople
Egyptian LGBT people
Board members of the Special Broadcasting Service
Australian people of Coptic descent
Australian people of Egyptian descent
Members of the Order of Australia